As of 2015, there are at least four translations of the Tirukkural available in Russian.

History
The joint effort of J. J. Glazov and A. Krishnamurthi resulted in the first Russian translation of the Kural text, published in 1963. In 1974, Alif Ibragimov published a translation in Moscow. The English translation of select couplets by C. Rajagopalachari was translated into Russian by D. V. Burba. This contains translation of 555 couplets from the first two books of the Kural text (Virtue and Wealth). In 1990, another translation of the complete text was made by Vithali Furniki, a translator in the Centre of Indian Cultural Studies, Moscow.

Translations

See also
 Tirukkural translations
 List of Tirukkural translations by language

References

Bibliography
 Furniki, V. (1990). Тируккурал. Available from http://www.tirukkural.narod.ru/
 Glazov, J. J. and Krishnamurthi, A. (1963). Thirukural, a Book on Virtue, Politics and Love. Moscow.

Russian
Translations into Russian